Savera may refer to:

Films
 Savera (1942 film), Indian Hindi language film.
 Savera (1958 film), Indian Hindi language film, directed by Satyen Bose starring Ashok Kumar and Meena Kumari

People
 Savera Nadeem, Pakistani actress and director.

Others
 Savera Hotel, an 11-storied four-star hotel located in Mylapore, Chennai, India.